Cordylodontidae is a family of conodonts.

Genera are Cordylodus. Eoconodontus and Iapetognathus.

References 

 The conodont apparatus as a food-gathering mechanism. Maurits Lindström, palaeontology, volume17, part 4, pages 729-744
 Taxonomy, Evolution, and Biostratigraphy of Conodonts from the Kechika Formation, Skoki Formation, and Road River Group (Upper Cambrian to Lower Silurian), Northeastern British Columbia. Leanne J. Pyle and Christopher R. Burnes, Canadian Journal of Earth Sciences,  38(10), pages 1387–1401, 2001,

External links 

Conodont families
Proconodontida